Thomas or Tom Stuart may refer to:

Lord Thomas Stuart, a ballad
Thomas Peter Anderson Stuart (1856–1920), professor of physiology
Thomas Stuart, rugby union player for Westport Rugby Football Club
 Tom Stuart (EastEnders), a character on the British soap opera EastEnders
 Tom Stuart (footballer) (1893–1957), English footballer
 Tom Stuart (politician) (1936–2001), mayor of Meridian, Mississippi, from 1973 to 1977

See also

Thomas Stewart (disambiguation)